This is a list of members of the House of Commons of Canada in the 41st Canadian Parliament (June 2, 2011 to August 2, 2015).

Members
Party leaders are italicized.
Cabinet ministers are in boldface.
The Prime Minister is both.

Alberta

 Voluntarily left caucus on December 5, 2011, and re-joined the Conservative caucus on June 6, 2013
 Left caucus on June 5, 2013

British Columbia

 Resigned from caucus March 31, 2015.

Manitoba

New Brunswick

Newfoundland and Labrador

 Suspended from caucus November 5, 2014.

Nova Scotia

Ontario

 Changed affiliation on February 9, 2015.
 Left caucus on September 26, 2013.
 Left New Democratic caucus April 23, 2012. Joined Green caucus December 13, 2013.
 Liberal leader until April 14, 2013.
 New Democratic leader until July 28, 2011.

Prince Edward Island

Quebec

 Expelled from caucus September 12, 2013.
 Resigned from Bloc Québécois caucus August 12, 2014. Sat as an independent until founding Strength in Democracy October 21, 2014.
 New Democratic leader from July 28, 2011, to March 24, 2012.
 Changed affiliation on February 27, 2013.
 Suspended from caucus June 6, 2014.
 New Democratic leader since March 24, 2012.
 Liberal leader since April 14, 2013.
 Changed affiliation on October 21, 2014.
 Resigned from caucus August 25, 2014.
 Suspended from caucus November 5, 2014.
 Changed affiliation on January 10, 2012.
 Changed affiliation on August 20, 2014.

Saskatchewan

The North

Changes since the 41st election
The party standings have changed as follows:

Membership changes

See also
List of senators in the 41st Parliament of Canada
Women in the 41st Canadian Parliament
By-elections to the 41st Canadian Parliament

References

House Members Of The 41st Parliament Of Canada, List Of
41st